A Dangerous Encounter is a 1985 novel by the German writer Ernst Jünger. The story is set in Paris in the late 19th century and follows a murder investigation in a decadent aristocratic environment. The book was published in English in 1993, translated by Hilary Barr.

Reception
Publishers Weekly reviewed the book in 1993, calling Junger's writing "shimmering" and "imaginative", and praised his portrayal of the character Ducasse, saying that the character is "the last practitioner of a gentlemanly decadence which itself is the faded reflection of a bygone social structure." Describing the flow of the book, they continued, "If the second half of the novel devolves into a rather unsatisfying francophonic Holmes and Watson riff, its beginning is a clear indication of Junger's talent.

Kirkus Reviews called it "a polished tale from the prolific Jünger, a 97-year-old author who's acclaimed in Europe but little known here", and wrote: "Delicately mannered and full of nuance, this is certainly subtle--but a side effect of its careful, quiet understatement is that it seems over before it's really begun".

References

1985 German novels
German detective novels
German historical novels
German-language novels
German mystery novels
Novels by Ernst Jünger
Novels set in Paris
Novels set in the 19th century